Da Thadiya (Hey Fatso) is a 2012 Malayalam romantic comedy film directed by Aashiq Abu, and starring Sekhar Menon in the lead role along with Nivin Pauly, Sreenath Bhasi and Ann Augustine in the supporting roles.  The film was produced by Anto Joseph in association with OPM cinema. DJ Sekhar Menon who had worked as the same in around 500 stages makes his film debut as an actor.

The film released on 21 December 2012 to mixed to positive reviews from critics and audience. It is the only film where actor Nivin Pauly acts in a negative role.

Plot 
The film tells the love story of an obese youth named Luke John Prakash. His close pal is his cousin Sunny Jose Prakash, a video jockey. Luke comes from a wealthy family, and his grandfather, Prakash was once mayor of Kochi and formed his own political party. Since childhood, Luke was in love with another obese girl named Ann Mary Thadikkaran, whose parents are working in an insurance company. One day, Ann Mary's parents get a transfer to Ernakulam and she along with her parents shifts there, leaving Luke heartbroken.

Many years later, Ann Mary comes back to meet Luke in his house and surprisingly she has lost weight. One day, Ann Mary takes Luke to a restaurant. He falls and breaks the chair. Realizing she is not so fond of his obesity, Luke embarks on Vaidyar's Clinic, an Ayurvedic centre run by Rahul Vaidyar to lose weight. One day, Luke escapes from the Ashram to meet Ann Mary on the Christmas Eve. There he is shocked to realize that Ann Mary is not in love him at all. Luke finds out through Rahul, who came for the Christmas Dinner with Ann Mary, that she is the marketing head of Vaidyar's Clinic and that she is in love with him and insults him. Rahul does a big punch on Luke, which brings him to the ground. Rahul insults his figure, and says that he is "just a mere machine that produces feces". Luke feels he is a good for nothing. However his grandmother Knight Rider motivates him by telling fat people are broad-minded and Prakash who was also fat was the mayor of Kochi had achieved much. In a dream, Luke sees Prakash telling that generations are necessary to accomplish the unfinished tasks of their forefathers. Inspired by this, Luke joins his father's political party Prakash Congress and finally becomes the mayor of Kochi. Ann Mary's father Joshua comes to meet Luke in the Mayor's office. He tells Luke that Ann Mary is very upset after the incident that happened in their house and she wants to meet him. Ann Mary says that Rahul is a corrupt person and he is making money by decreasing the self-esteem of many people through advertisements and posters and he is engaged to girl called Sowmya. She tells that the god punished her for insulting Luke. Luke raides Rahul's business forcing Rahul to go into hiding. He then discovers Rahul at his hiding place, beats him and warns him to stop his business, thus taking his revenge for beating him.

The story comes back to the present as Luke is waiting for Ann Mary in the beach. Ann Mary proposes to Luke. But to everyone's surprise Luke rejects her proposal telling her that he is not her superman. He also thanks her for teaching him that it is better to live for many than to live for one.

Cast

 Sekhar Menon as Luke John Prakash
 Nivin Pauly as Rahul Vaidyar
 Sreenath Bhasi as Sunny Jose Prakash
 Ann Augustine as Ann Mary Thadikkaran
 Arundathi Nag as Knight Rider, Grandmother of Luke & Sunny
 Maniyanpilla Raju as John Prakash
 Edavela Babu as Jose Prakash
 Vinay Forrt as Shanthanoo
 N. L. Balakrishnan as Prakashan, Grandfather of Luke & Sunny
 Jins Varghese as Anish Naduvilethu (main TV Reporter)
 RJ Renu (voice-over) 
 Jayaraj Warrier as Dasan, former Mayor of Kochi
 Basil Kothamangalam as Luke's friend 
 Kunchan as Joshua Thadikkaran
 Thesni Khan as Rani Thadikkaran
 Gayathri as Rosemol, Luke's mother
 V K Sreeraman as Hajiyaar
 Anoop Sankar
 Soubin Shahir
 Shine Tom Chacko
 Jonathan Abraham as young Luke John Prakash

Soundtrack
The film features score and soundtrack composed by Bijibal.

The song "Enthanu Bhai" which was officially released in YouTube in November was a tremendous success and registered 4 lakh hits in the Internet within a month of its release. There has been allegations that the song was inspired by Sneha Khanwalkar's songs "Yere..." and "tung tung". Aashiq Abu is not perturbed by these allegations. "I prefer not to respond to such allegations. I want the listeners to decide for themselves. Our song has been electronically created for the film, while 'Yere...' has original sounds," he says.

Critical reception
Rediff gave the movie 3/5 stars, stating the film shows "If your goal is the common good of the people then you can achieve unprecedented success" and that "The message that slimming clinics are mostly run by quacks who wish to cash in on the vulnerability of fat people does not get diluted in the fun and frolics."

Veeyen at nowrunning.com gave the movie 3/5 stars

References

External links

2012 films
2010s Malayalam-language films
2012 romantic comedy films
Indian romantic comedy films
Films shot in Kochi
Films directed by Aashiq Abu